The 2013 season is Santos FC's 101st season in existence and the club's fifty-fourth consecutive season in the top flight of Brazilian football.

Santos reached the Campeonato Paulista Finals for fifth consecutive season, but failed to win their fourth consecutive title as they lost by 2–3 on aggregate for their biggest rival, Corinthians.
On 25 May 2013, Santos announced that they had sold Neymar to Barcelona for a fee of € 57 million. A week later, the club sacked the head coach Muricy Ramalho due to the discontent of the crowd and the club's directors with his results. For his place, Claudinei Oliveira assumed as caretaker.
As part of Neymar's sold to Barcelona, Santos played in the Joan Gamper Torphy against them and suffered their third worst defeat in history, losing by 8–0. In the Copa do Brasil, Santos were eliminated in the Round of 16, losing 1–2 on aggregate score to Grêmio. On 30 August, Claudinei Oliveira was promoted to head coach after 3 months as caretaker.

Players

Squad information

1 Player has his rights assigned to another club where he has never played for (such as Tombense, Deportivo Maldonado and Mirassol).Last updated: 8 December 2013Source: Santos FC for appearances and goals.

Reserve players

Joan Gamper Trophy squad

Source:

Starting XI

4–4–2 Formation

According to the most recent line-ups.

<div style="position: relative;">

Appearances and goals

Last updated: 8 December 2013Source: Match reports in Competitive matches, Soccerway

Goalscorers

Last updated: 8 December 2013Source: Match reports in Competitive matches

Disciplinary record

Club

Coaching staff

Other staff

Club officials

Kit

Source: Home Ayaw  Third

Official sponsorship

 CSU CardSystem
 Seara
 Corr Plastik
 Minds Idiomas
 Zurich Seguros

Transfers

Transfers in

Loans in

Transfers out

 1: Included in Montillo transfer

Loans out

Contracts

Friendlies

Competitions

Overall summary

Detailed overall summary

{|class="wikitable" style="text-align: center;"
|-
!
!Total
! Home
! Away
|-
|align=left| Games played          || 69 || 35 || 34
|-
|align=left| Games won             || 30 || 18 || 12
|-
|align=left| Games drawn           || 24 || 14 || 10
|-
|align=left| Games lost            || 15 || 3 || 12
|-
|align=left| Biggest win           || 5–1 v Náutico || 4–1 v Portuguesa || 5–1 v Náutico
|-
|align=left| Biggest loss          || 0–3 v Portuguesa || 1–3 v Paulista || 0–3 v Portuguesa
|-
|align=left| Clean sheets          || 23 || 13 || 10
|-
|align=left| Goals scored          || 99 || 52 || 47
|-
|align=left| Goals conceded        || 69 || 27 || 42
|-
|align=left| Goal difference       || +30 || +25 || +5
|-
|-
|-
|align=left| Yellow cards         || 138 || 68 || 70
|-
|align=left| Red cards       || 6 || 5 || 1
|-
|align=left| Most appearances     || align=center| Cícero (66) ||align=center| Cícero (33) ||align=center| Cícero (33)
|-
|align=left| Top scorer   || align=center| Cícero (24) ||align=center| Cícero (15) ||align=center| Neymar (9)Cícero (9)
|-
|align=left|Worst discipline      || align=center| Renê Júnior  (13) ||align=center|Cícero  (6)||align=center| Renê Júnior  (8)
|-
|align=left| Points               || 114/207 (%) || 68/105 (%) || 46/102 (%)
|-
|align=left| Winning rate         || (%) || (%) || (%)
|-

Campeonato Brasileiro

Results summary

Results by round

League table

Matches

Source:

Copa do Brasil

First round

Second round

Third round

Round of 16

Campeonato Paulista

Results summary

First stage

League table

Results by round

Matches

Knockout stage

Quarter-final

Semi-final

Finals

References

External links
Official Site 
Official Youtube Channel 

2013
Santos F.C.